The Lincoln County School District is a public school district in Lincoln County, Georgia, United States, based in Lincolnton. It serves the communities of Chennault and Lincolnton.

Schools
The Lincoln County School District has one elementary school, one middle school, and one high school.

Elementary school
 Lincoln County Elementary School

Middle school
 Lincoln County Middle School

High school
 Lincoln County High School

References

External links

School districts in Georgia (U.S. state)
Education in Lincoln County, Georgia